The Friends is a South Korean reality show. The show already has 8 seasons.

Seasons

Season 1: Friends in Macau
 Lee Ki-woo
 Hyun Woo
 Seo Ha-joon

Season 2: The Friends in Cebu
 Ha Seok-jin
 Lee Jae-yoon
 Yoo Ha-joon

Season 3: The Friends in Tottori
 Yoon Se-ah
 Shin Da-eun
 Park Ran

Season 4: The Friends in Taiwan
 Lee Jung-jin
 Kang Dong-jun
 Goh Tae-yong

Season 5: The Friends in Croatia
 Jang Hyuk
 Shin Seung-hwan
 Choi Ki-sup

Season 6: The Friends in Switzerland
 Leeteuk
 Ryeowook

Season 7: The Friends in Chiang Mai
 Joon Park
 Danny Ahn
 Ryohei Otani

Season 8: The Friends in Costa Rica
 Eric Nam
 Sam Kim
 Song Yuvin

Season 9: The Friends in Adriatic Sea
 GFriend

References

External links
 Friends in Macau
 The Friends in Cebu
 The Friends in Tottori
 The Friends in Taiwan
 The Friends in Croatia
 The Friends in Switzerland
 The Friends in Chiang Mai
 The Friends in Costa Rica

South Korean reality television series
South Korean travel television series
Korean-language television shows
2010s South Korean television series
2014 South Korean television series debuts
Television shows filmed in Macau
Television shows filmed in the Philippines
Television shows filmed in Japan
Television shows filmed in Taiwan
Television shows filmed in Croatia
Television shows filmed in Switzerland
Television shows filmed in Thailand
Television shows filmed in Costa Rica